The Essential Collection is a compilation album released in 2000 by the band Duran Duran. It was re-released in 2007 and almost exclusively covers material from their first two albums, Duran Duran and Rio.

Track listing
 "Girls on Film"  – 3:28
 "Planet Earth"  – 3:56
 "Fame"  – 3:19
 "Careless Memories"  – 3:53
 "Anyone Out There"  – 4:01
 "Sound of Thunder"  – 4:05
 "Is There Something I Should Know?"  – 4:10
 "Like an Angel"  – 4:46
 "Hold Back the Rain"  – 3:48
 "Save a Prayer" (US Single Version)  – 3:46
 "My Own Way"  – 4:50
 "Rio" (US Edit) – 4:45
 "New Religion"  – 4:00
 "The Chauffeur"  – 5:12
 "Hungry Like the Wolf" (Single Version)  – 3:24
 "Lonely in Your Nightmare" – 3:48
 "Last Chance on the Stairway" – 4:19
 "Make Me Smile (Come Up and See Me)" (Live) – 4:55

References

2007 greatest hits albums
Duran Duran compilation albums